The 1909 Kentucky State College Blue and White football team represented Kentucky State College—now known as the University of Kentucky—during the 1909 college football season. When the Kentucky team was welcomed home after the upset win over Illinois, Philip Carbusier said that they had "fought like wildcats", a nickname that stuck.

Schedule

References

Kentucky State College
Kentucky Wildcats football seasons
Kentucky State College Blue and White football